Labeobarbus gulielmi is a species of ray-finned fish in the genus Labeobarbus which is known only from the Cuanza River in Angola.

References 

 

Endemic fauna of Angola
gulielmi
Cyprinid fish of Africa
Fish of Angola
Taxa named by George Albert Boulenger
Fish described in 1910